Dr. Alex Blake ( Miller) is a fictional character on the CBS crime drama Criminal Minds, portrayed by Jeanne Tripplehorn. Blake first appeared in "The Silencer" (Season 8 - Episode 1), replacing Agent Emily Prentiss who had resigned to move to Interpol in "Run" (Season 7 - Episode 24).

On May 14, 2014, it was revealed in the season 9 finale that Blake would be leaving as a character in the show, making "Demons" (Season 9 - Episode 24) Tripplehorn's final episode as a main cast member.

Background
Blake's appointment at the BAU was met with some mixed reactions as the team was close to Prentiss. Blake joined the BAU to restore her reputation after she was blamed for arresting the wrong suspect in the Amerithrax case and Section Chief Erin Strauss let her take the fall. As a result, she and Strauss did not initially get along, with Strauss accusing her of joining for selfish reasons. Eventually they make amends, and the rest of the team is able to recognize her expertise, making them generally less antagonistic towards her.

Blake graduated from Berkeley with a double major and also holds a PhD in linguistics. She was recruited to the FBI at the age of 24, making her one of two team members to join the Bureau in their early 20s (the other being Spencer Reid). Blake is also a professor of forensic linguistics at Georgetown, where Reid had previously guest lectured, and an SSA in the Washington field office. During her initial time at the FBI, Blake was involved in some high-profile cases, particularly the Unabomber case.
Blake understands American Sign Language.
In the season nine episode "Bully", it is revealed that Blake is estranged from her father Damon (a retired police captain of the Kansas City Police Department) and younger brother Scott (a current homicide detective with the KCPD); after the death of her older brother Danny (a cop killed in the line of duty) and her mother, she found it too painful to be near her father and brother, and distanced herself from them. However, after Scott is injured by the unsub, the two siblings start to reconnect, and by the end of the episode, she reconciles with both Scott and Damon.

Season eight
In "The Silencer", Blake resumes work with the BAU, specifically the team headed by Hotch and Rossi, and helps them investigate a serial killer in Seattle, Washington, who is using his son to lure in his victims and, according to her, "makes Ridgway look like a saint". Upon returning from Seattle, she meets Morgan and Garcia, who had just returned from their short visit to Prentiss in England, and her interaction with Garcia is awkward. Blake then assists the team in their investigation of an escaped convict revealed to be the infamous serial killer "The Silencer". She and Reid work together in trying to decipher messages left by the unsub, and when the Silencer is properly identified and brought into custody, Blake uses her knowledge of sign-language to communicate with him, as he is deaf and mute. Her attempt to reach him is unsuccessful and he commits suicide. At the end of the episode, Blake and Garcia meet up and redo their introductions, starting a friendship.

In "God Complex", she notices that Reid is acting strangely, and when he asks her to drop him off at a payphone, she does so before asking him what is going on. Reid promptly tells her that he has started calling a woman named Maeve Donovan in a potential romantic relationship, which he meant to keep private. Blake promises not to tell anyone. By the end of the episode, Morgan tells Reid that he knows his secret, but from Garcia. Reid then thanks Blake for keeping his confidence while she is still sleeping. In "The Good Earth", Blake assists in the current investigation and is able to successfully talk down the delusional unsub, allowing for an arrest. In "Magnum Opus", she is able to deduce the motivation behind the unsub's killings and particularly embraces Reid's return to the BAU after a brief leave following Maeve's death. In "Carbon Copy", she finally accepts an apology given by Strauss, who wanted to make amends following the Amerithrax case.

In "#6", James makes a surprise visit to her home. He tries telling her something, but before he could complete his announcement, Blake receives a call from the BAU, and she is forced to leave and investigate a case. James approves, knowing that it is her job. By the end of the episode, she returns home, and James finally tells her that he had been offered a job as a professor at Harvard University, and that he agreed to take it if Blake came with him and took up a position as a linguistics professor. He then cites that the two had wanted to be a "real couple" again, and that this was their opportunity. However, Blake turns him down, saying that she was attached to her current job. Expecting that response, James agrees to the terms she offers, in which she would visit him on weekends and holidays. In "Brothers Hotchner", she volunteers to drive Strauss back to her New York City hotel room after the team solves a case.

In the following episode, a serial killer and stalker known as the Replicator abducts and kills Strauss. The ensuing investigation reveals that the Replicator has a personal vendetta against Blake, since he had been copying unsubs, the team apprehended following her induction into the BAU. As a result, they find the Replicator's first victim, a woman killed in the style of the serial killer she and the team captured in Seattle last year. They then identify the Replicator as John Curtis, a brilliant but reclusive FBI agent who investigated the Amerithrax case alongside Blake and Strauss; he was targeting the BAU because he too was set up for a fall by Strauss after the wrong arrest. As a result, Curtis had been severely demoted, and when Blake was able to rise back to the top by resuming work with the BAU, he became jealous and targeted the team, especially Blake. When the team heads over to a stretch of land owned by Curtis's family, the helicopter carrying her, Reid, and Hotch is hacked into by Curtis and crash-lands. Curtis then ambushes the passengers, knocking them out with knock-out gas and abducting Blake, taking her into a house rigged with multiple explosives. He places her on a seat specifically designed to trigger the countdown process, and when she regains consciousness, Curtis rants to her about the success she achieved while he continued to suffer from his demotion. He then leaves, just as the rest of the BAU, save for Rossi, who was forced to stay behind after a poisoning incident, burst in to rescue her. However, they are all trapped inside the room; Curtis's intention was to ultimately kill the team with the bombs. Garcia manages to counteract the countdown, giving Rossi (who went to the house on his own accord) enough time to rescue the trapped agents, including Blake. Rossi then traps Curtis inside the room, just before it explodes, presumably killing him. Blake later celebrates Strauss's life with the rest of the A team.

Season nine
In the episode "In The Blood", Blake attends Garcia's "Day of the Dead"-themed party. When the team begins setting up photos of family members or close friends that are currently dead, Blake puts up a photo of her mother and tells them about how she instilled in her a love of crossword puzzles, which later inspired her to pursue a linguistics career.

In the episode "Bully", Blake investigates a case in Los Angeles with the rest of the team and gets shot in the arm by the unsub while trying to stop him from killing a woman he abducted. Moments later, she receives a call from Damon, who asks her to return to her hometown of Kansas City, where he is investigating the murder of a jogger, which he believes may be connected to the murders of two high-school students. Blake agrees and takes the BAU to Kansas City, where she is greeted by Damon. It quickly becomes clear that Damon thinks more highly of Blake than he does of their other brother, Scott, with whom Blake has tension. Later on, when Scott is beaten unconscious by the unsub as he interrogates a man named Charles Gates (who is then killed by the unsub), Blake and Damon both fall into despair in the wake of the attack, and the former becomes more connected to the case than ever. The unsub is eventually arrested the next night, and the following day, Blake drives Scott to the family home, where he realizes finally that she had been shot, something she never disclosed to him or Damon. She admits that she never visited her family or even gave them a phone call because she felt that by doing so, she would be reminded of their late mother and brother. The two then make amends as they have a barbecue with Damon and the entire BAU team.

In the episode "200", she assisted the rest of the team in finding JJ and FBI Section Chief Director Mateo Cruz when both go missing. During the search, the BAU resorts to the help of Prentiss, whom Blake replaced, and the two of them met for the first time. At the end of the episode, Blake expresses her happiness in finally meeting the agent the others have told her about.

In "Mr. & Mrs. Anderson", Blake leads the interrogation of murder suspect Judith Anderson, who requests to make a phone call to her husband and co-conspirator Alan, but Blake denies the request and asks about Alan's sexually-transmitted disease. Judith says that she knew about it and that they no longer kept secrets in their marriage. Blake then shows her photos of women that Alan killed alone, but she continues to protect him and asks for a lawyer. Later, Blake tells Judith that Alan tried to rape and kill Kathleen Benedict before promising her that if she is cooperative, she will move to get her sentence reduced. When Judith refuses to take up the offer, Blake tells her that the necklace Alan gave her earlier was stolen from a victim that he killed alone the same night he gave it to her. This enrages her, and when she sees him as he is being taken into the police station, she angrily slaps him, throws the necklace in his face, and declares that she hates him.

In the episode "Blood Relations", Blake assists the team in the search for an unsub in West Virginia. Upon arrival at the shack where the unsub was conceived, the team decides to split up in the forest to cover more ground. Blake searches her area alone and informs Morgan that she has eyes on Cissy Howard, whom the unsub had rigged to a tree. The unsub then appears, and tackles Blake and they both fall into the water, with Blake pulling her trigger aimlessly. One bullet grazes the unsub in the head, apparently knocking him unconscious and causing both to submerge into the water, and when Morgan, Rossi, and JJ call out for Blake, JJ notices some bubbles in the lake. Blake resurfaces and orders them to "shoot everywhere", but when they can't find a body, Blake gets worried. She dries off, and talks with JJ about how she's doing. JJ insists that the unsub is dead, and Blake repeats this to herself. However, the unsub is shown to be alive and well, attacking a couple in Kentucky.

Departure
In the season 9 two-part finale, "Angels" and "Demons", Blake becomes distraught and depressed when Reid has a near-fatal shot to the neck by the unsub after pushing Blake out of the way, even commenting that it should have been her who was shot instead. She is further upset after rescuing a young boy who was being used by the unsub as leverage against his mother. Though Reid survives, Alex is greatly shaken by the case, and reveals to Reid that both he and the young boy reminded her of her deceased son Ethan, who died of an unnamed neurological disease at age 9. Her guilt and distress over Reid's brush with death touched a major nerve with her, seemingly pushing her to the breaking point. At the end of "Demons", she sits apart from the rest of the group on the plane ride home, and it is implied that she sends a text message to Hotch handing in her resignation. After taking Reid home, telling him about Ethan, and departing, Reid finds her FBI badge in his bag, and watches her leave, saddened but accepting, from his window.

In the first episode of season 10 it was confirmed that she had left to return to teaching.

References

Criminal Minds characters
Fictional Behavioral Analysis Unit agents
Television characters introduced in 2012